Puran Singh Phartyal is an Indian politician and member of the Bharatiya Janata Party and was a member of the Uttarakhand Legislative Assembly from the Lohaghat constituency in Champawat district.

References 

People from Champawat district
Bharatiya Janata Party politicians from Uttarakhand
Members of the Uttarakhand Legislative Assembly
Living people
Uttarakhand MLAs 2017–2022
Year of birth missing (living people)